Kaip is the name of several rural localities in Russia:
Kaip, Altai Krai, a selo in Kaipsky Selsoviet of Klyuchevsky District in Altai Krai; 
Kaip, Kemerovo Oblast, a village in Poperechenskaya Rural Territory of Yurginsky District in Kemerovo Oblast;